Shin Jai-ho (born 1977) is a South Korean film director and screenwriter. Shin debuted as a screenwriter in 2002 with the film Baby Alone and directed his first feature film 100 Days with Mr. Arrogant in 2004. In 2006, Shin was cited as the 14th most influential figure in Korean popular culture according to a survey conducted by the Herald Business Daily of the country's top 30 pop icons.

Personal life 
Shin graduated from Seoul Institute of the Arts, majoring in Creative Writing.

Filmography

As director 
100 Days with Mr. Arrogant (2004)
Super Monkey Returns (2011)
Wedding Scandal (2012)
Days of Wrath (2013)
The Outsider: Mean Streets (2015)
Untouchable Lawman (2015)
Duel: Final Round (2016)
Gate (2018)

As screenwriter 
Baby Alone (2002)
100 Days with Mr. Arrogant (2004)
4th Period Mystery (2009)
Super Monkey Returns (2011)
Wedding Scandal (2012)
Days of Wrath (2013)
Untouchable Lawman (2015)

Original idea 
Ditto (2000)

References

External links 
 
 

1977 births
Living people
South Korean film directors
South Korean screenwriters
Seoul Institute of the Arts alumni